The Western Red Wings (officially the Arsenault's Fish Mart Western Red Wings due to sponsorship reasons) are a Canadian Junior B ice hockey team located in Abrams Village, Prince Edward Island. They play in the Island Junior Hockey League. Nathan Desroches serves as the team's head coach for the 2016–17 season, while their General Manager is JC Gallant.

Recent history

The Western Red Wings historically are the second most elite team in the IJHL, behind the repetitive champions the Kensington Vipers. They continuously make the league final, but rarely win the championship. They played in the 2015 Don Johnson Memorial Cup, the Maritime Junior hockey championship, when the tournament was played in Abrams Village.

The 2016–17 season saw the Red Wings win their first playoff championships to advance to the Don Johnson Memorial Cup as the IJHL representative.

Season-by-season record

Don Johnson Memorial Cup
Eastern Canada Jr B Championships

See also

 List of ice hockey teams in Prince Edward Island

References

External links
IJHL Website

Ice hockey teams in Prince Edward Island